Athletes from the Palestinian territories, represented by the Palestine Olympic Committee and competing as Palestine, participated in the 2000 Summer Olympics in Sydney, Australia.

Athletics

Men

Swimming

Women

See also
 Palestine at the 2000 Summer Paralympics

References
Official Olympic Reports

Nations at the 2000 Summer Olympics
2000
Summer Olympics